Paul Dunn may refer to:
Paul Dunn (American football) (born 1960), American football coach
Paul Dunn (rugby league) (born 1963), Australian rugby league footballer
Paul H. Dunn (1924–1998), American Mormon leader
Paul Dunn (playwright), Canadian playwright and actor

See also
Paul Dunne (disambiguation)